The Huansu S5 is a 5-seat compact SUV produced by Huansu, a sub-brand of BAIC Motor and Yinxiang Group.

Overview 

The Huansu S5 is manufactured by Beiqi Yinxiang Automobile. Based on the same platform as the Senova X55, the Huansu S5 is powered by a newly developed, codenamed F13B 1.3 liter turbocharged engine with 133hp and 185nm mated to a five-speed manual transmission or a CVT. The same engine was later shared with the Bisu T3 and was produced by a Chongqing company called Kaite Engine. the Huansu S5 was officially launched in March 2017, with prices ranging from 69,800 yuan to 79,800 yuan at launch, and later from 59,800 yuan to 85,800 yuan.

References

External links 

 Official Website

Cars introduced in 2017
Crossover sport utility vehicles
front-wheel-drive vehicles
2010s cars
Cars of China